Reginald Lee (19 May 1870 – 6 August 1913) was a lookout stationed in the crow's nest of the RMS Titanic when the ship collided with an iceberg at 23:40 on 14 April 1912.

Biography
Born in Benson, England, Lee served in the Royal Navy as Assistant-Paymaster until placed on the retired list in February 1900.

He joined the Titanics crew on 6 April 1912, having been transferred from its sister ship, RMS Olympic. On 14 April at 22:00, Lee joined lookout Frederick Fleet in the crow's nest replacing Archie Jewell and George Symons. The binoculars the two men should have used were unavailable, as the keys to the case in which they were locked were not on board, forcing the lookouts to rely on their eyesight.

When the Titanic began to founder, Lee was ordered to man lifeboat No. 13, which was launched from the ship's starboard side at 01:30 As a result, Lee survived the sinking, as did Fleet, and testified before the Board of Trade inquiry into the disaster.

Lee returned to sea, last serving aboard the Kenilworth Castle, before dying from pneumonia-related complications in Southampton on 6 August 1913.

References

External links
 

1870 births
1913 deaths
Deaths from pneumonia in England
RMS Titanic survivors
British Merchant Navy personnel
Royal Navy officers
Royal Navy logistics officers